Arts of Asia, founded in 1970, is the foremost international magazine of Asian arts and antiques, and has the largest circulation of any Asian art magazine. It is published four times a year, and is distributed to 90 countries. Supported by museums, cultural organisations, universities and schools worldwide, as well as major auction houses and art dealers, and collectors and students of art, the magazine provides an unparalleled understanding of the international arts scene. It offers essential reading about Asian art and culture, and provides collectors and scholars of the field with a valuable research resource, as well as vital information about industry trends.

History 
Arts of Asia was founded in 1970 by Tuyet Nguyet, who was also the magazine's first publisher and editor. Nguyet first conceived the idea for the magazine in 1969, combining her interests in Asian art and antiques with her journalistic background to promote an understanding and appreciation for Asian art and culture. In 1970, a preview edition appeared, followed by the magazine's first issue in January–February 1971, featuring Ming dynasty (1368–1644) Shekwan (Shiwan) ware on the cover. The issue included in-depth articles and auction news.

Nguyet built the publication with the help of her husband and Arts of Asia’s associate editor, Stephen Markbreiter, an established architect who designed many of Hong Kong's important buildings such as the Mandarin Oriental. Nguyet was a key player in the establishment of Hong Kong offices for the major auction houses, Sotheby's and Christie's. In 1973, Nguyet encouraged Sotheby's to set up a Hong Kong office, which it did, holding its inaugural regional auction that same year, the first international auction house to do so in Asia. In 1980, she went to New York to advise James Lally of Sotheby's to bring modern Chinese paintings to Hong Kong. The auction house's first sale of modern Chinese paintings took place on May 28th of that year at City Hall. In 1984, at the urging of collectors and dealers, Nguyet went to London to convince Christie's also to establish a presence in Hong Kong. The house held its first auction in the city in January 1986.

Between 1971 and 1974, Nguyet and Stephen Markbreiter wrote numerous articles on Chinese culture and the arts following their first visit to China in 1965, including on Beijing's Palace Museum ("The Temple of Heaven in Peking," May–June 1972), at a time when few people travelled to China. By the mid-1970s, Arts of Asia had established a global presence with a growing subscriber base, most notably in the United States, Australia, Europe and Japan.

In 1986, the magazine's November–December issue featured "Chinese paintings in the Imperial Age" from the National Palace Museum as its cover story, written by Wang Yao-t'ing, Lee Yu-min, Tu Shu-hua, and Ho Ch'uan-hsing, the first time that scholarly articles, written by Chinese specialists, were translated into English and presented to an international readership.

In 1995, Arts of Asia established its website, offering a searchable database of articles.

In 2017, Nguyet's son, Robin Markbreiter, who was the magazine's executive editor, became publisher and editor.

Arts of Asia celebrated its 50th anniversary in 2020, publishing a milestone "50th Anniversary Edition" in January–February, which featured 50 outstanding Asian artworks from prestigious museums, institutions and private collections, selected by museum directors, curators, and specialists of the field.

Awards 
Arts of Asia received the Gold Prize For Magazine category at the 2009 China Print Awards for its November–December 2008 issue.

Notable Contributors 
Leading experts of Asian art including learned artists, museum curators, collectors, and academics, have contributed to Arts of Asia over the years, including among others, the following:

Christian Boehm
Paul Bromberg
Sheila R. Canby
John T. Carpenter
William Chak
Nicolas Chow
Tetsuro Degawa
Giuseppe Eskenazi
Menno Fitski
Sylvia Fraser-Lu
Hollis Goodall
Guo Fuxiang
John Guy
Julian Harding
Jessica Harrison-Hall
Maxwell K. (Mike) Hearn
Anna Jackson
Rose Kerr
Roger Keverne
Simon Kwan
James J. Lally
Peter Lam
Eric Lefebvre
Denise Patry Leidy
James C.S. Lin
Kai-yin Lo
Victor Lo
Richard Marchant
Maria Kar-wing Mok
Kerry Nguyen-Long
Estelle Niklès van Osselt
Pratapaditya Pal
Rod. Paras-Perez
Stacey Pierson
Santiago Albano Pilar
Jane Portal
Amy G. Poster
Adriana Proser
Howard and Mary Ann Rogers
Ditas R. Samson
Rosemary Scott
Colin Sheaf
Jan Stuart
Paula Swart
Paul Michael Taylor
Susan Tosk
Ramon Villegas
John E. Vollmer
Clarissa von Spee
Richard Wesley
Ming Wilson
Jay Xu
Josh Yiu

Notable Features 
Each cover of the magazine highlights an artwork or painting from an exhibition or collection of a distinguished museum, institution, or collector. These have included, among others, works from the following organizations: 

 Ayala Museum
 British Museum
 Brooklyn Museum
 Cleveland Museum of Art
 Fitzwilliam Museum
 Hong Kong Museum of Art
 Linden Museum
 Metropolitan Museum of Art
 Museum of Cultural History, Oslo
 Museum of Oriental Ceramics, Osaka
 National Palace Museum
 Palace Museum Beijing
 Peabody Essex Museum
 Rietberg Museum
 Shanghai Museum
 Victoria and Albert Museum

References

External links 
https://artsofasia.com/

1970 establishments in Hong Kong
Visual arts magazines
Magazines published in Hong Kong
Magazines established in 1970
Quarterly magazines published in Hong Kong
Asian culture
Antiques
Modern art
Asian art